Westport station may refer to:

 Westport railway station, Mayo in County Mayo, Ireland
 Westport station (New York), an Amtrak station in Westport, New York, USA
 Westport station (Connecticut), a Metro-North Railroad station in Westport, Connecticut, USA
 Westport station (Baltimore Light Rail), a Baltimore Light Rail station in South Baltimore, Maryland, USA